The Intelligence Medal of Merit is awarded by the Central Intelligence Agency for performance of especially meritorious service or for achievement conspicuously above normal duties.

Notable recipients

Gust Avrakotos
I. Nathan Briggs
George W. Cave
John Chambers (1923–2001) Hollywood make-up artist involved in Canadian Caper during 1979 Iran hostage crisis (aka Jerome Calloway)
Gene A. Coyle
Richard G. Fecteau
Gina Haspel
John J. Hicks, former director of National Photographic Interpretation Center; for his work during the Cuban Missile Crisis.
J.B.E. Hittle
Stephen Kasarda
Mark Kelton, former deputy director of the National Clandestine Service for Counterintelligence
Harry E. Mason
Edmund H. Nowinski (twice)
Jerrold Post
Robert Schaller
Frank Snepp
John Stockwell
David O. Sullivan
Al Ulmer
Charles Wilson, first non-Agency Officer to be awarded the Medal

See also
Awards and decorations of the United States government

References

Awards and decorations of the Central Intelligence Agency
Recipients of the Intelligence Medal of Merit